Khlong Khanan Chit railway station is a railway station on northeastern railway line, located in Khlong Phai Subdistrict, Sikhio District, Nakhon Ratchasima Province, Isan (northeastern Thailand).

History 
It was upgraded from railway halt to railway station on May 10, 1953. Originally, the building of the station was located in the current location of Lam Ta Khong Dam. Later on, when the dam was built, therefore moved the station to the current location. The station is opposite to Lam Ta Khong Dam and Highway 2 (Mittraphap Road), and located by the reservoir. The station is currently being rebuilt as part of the double tracking project between Map Kabao and Thanon Chira Junction.

Train services 
 Local train No. 431/432 Kaeng Khoi–Khon Kaen–Kaeng Khoi
 Ordinary train No. 233/234 Bangkok–Surin–Bangkok

References

Railway stations in Thailand